Cian Thomas Bolger (born 12 March 1992) is an Irish professional footballer who plays as a defender for Larne.

Club career

Leicester City
Bolger was born in Celbridge, County Kildare, Ireland, and was Leicester City's academy Player of the Year in 2009.

Loans to Bristol Rovers
He made his debut in the Football League while on loan at Bristol Rovers, when he came on as a 78th-minute substitute for Carl Regan in a 6–1 defeat to Walsall on 29 January 2011. Bolger was sent off for the first time in his senior career on 8 February 2011, after a second yellow card for a poor challenge on Rochdale player Chris O'Grady. On 11 July, Bolger returned to Bristol Rovers on a 6-month loan deal. On 24 September 2011, Bolger scored the first professional goal of his career.

On 31 August 2012, Bolger was loaned to Bristol Rovers for a third time, until 1 January 2013. On 8 September 2012 he sustained cruciate ligament injury in a 2–2 draw against Aldershot Town, which prevented him from playing for over 3 months. He made his comeback on Boxing Day, coincidentally in another 2–2 draw against Aldershot, playing the full 90 minutes.

Bolton Wanderers
On 31 January 2013, Bolger signed for Bolton Wanderers. On 28 March, he scored the winner for Bolton Wanderers Reserves in a 3–2 win over Stoke City Reserves. He is a former captain of the Bolton Development squad but didn't make any appearances for the first team squad during his time at Bolton.

Colchester United (loan)
In October 2013 Bolger signed a one-month loan deal with Colchester United and made 4 league appearances.

Southend United (loan)
On 21 February 2014, Bolger joined League Two side Southend United on a 28-day loan, but his loan spell was cut short after just one appearance due to an ankle injury on 24 February 2014.

Southend United
On 5 August 2014 Bolger signed a two-year permanent deal with Southend United.

On 14 April 2015, Bolger scored his first goal for Southend United in the 45th minute against Newport County with a towering header. Bolger scored Southend's final penalty in the shoot-out in the play-off final on 23 May 2015, Southend were promoted winning 7–6.

Fleetwood Town
Bolger signed for Fleetwood Town on 22 May 2016, and went on to make over 100 appearances for the club. He scored his first goal for Fleetwood in an FA Cup tie against Southport on 15 November 2016.

Lincoln City
Bolger signed for Lincoln City on 17 January 2019.

Northampton Town
Bolger signed a one-year contract at Northampton Town on 21 August 2020 ahead of the 2020/21 campaign.

Larne 
After a single season at Northampton, Bolger signed for NIFL Premiership club Larne on 5 July 2021.

Honours
Southend United
Football League Two play-offs: 2015

Lincoln City
EFL League Two: 2018–19

Larne
County Antrim Shield (2): 2021-22, 2022-23

Career statistics

References

External links

Republic of Ireland profile at Soccer Scene

1992 births
Living people
People from Celbridge
Republic of Ireland association footballers
Republic of Ireland under-21 international footballers
Association football defenders
Leicester City F.C. players
Bristol Rovers F.C. players
Bolton Wanderers F.C. players
Colchester United F.C. players
Southend United F.C. players
Bury F.C. players
Fleetwood Town F.C. players
Northampton Town F.C. players
Lincoln City F.C. players
Larne F.C. players
English Football League players